Clinton is an unincorporated community in Franklin Township, Ripley County, in the U.S. state of Indiana.

History
Clinton was founded in 1833.

Geography

References

Unincorporated communities in Ripley County, Indiana
Unincorporated communities in Indiana